Roland Brunner (born August 12, 1970 in Klagenfurt, Carinthia) is a former ice speed skater from Austria, who represented his native country in three consecutive Winter Olympics, starting in 1992 in Albertville, France.

References

External links
 SkateResults

1970 births
Living people
Austrian male speed skaters
Speed skaters at the 1992 Winter Olympics
Speed skaters at the 1994 Winter Olympics
Speed skaters at the 1998 Winter Olympics
Olympic speed skaters of Austria